Rostaing is a French leather company.

Rostaing may also refer to:

Rostaing Berenguier (14th century), Provençal troubadour
Hubert Rostaing (1904–1999), French linguist
Charles Rostaing (1918–1990), French musician

See also
Rostagnus, for the given name Rostaing
House of Sabran, which had several members named Rostaing